"Duchess" is a single by The Stranglers from the album The Raven. The ninth track on the album, it peaked at number 14 in the UK Singles Chart. The supporting video for the song was banned by the BBC, as they deemed it blasphemous for its content, which featured the band dressed up as choirboys.

Reception
Smash Hits said, "Hugh Cornwell actually sings. Yeah, a bit shaky maybe, but it's proper singing. And the song's quite nice. But it's also repetitive and lacks any real substance."

Cover versions
 The song was covered by My Life Story as part of EMI's centenary celebrations in 1997 and reached the UK Top 40.

References

The Stranglers songs
1979 singles
Song recordings produced by Alan Winstanley
Music videos directed by Russell Mulcahy
1979 songs
Songs written by Dave Greenfield
Songs written by Hugh Cornwell
Songs written by Jet Black
Songs written by Jean-Jacques Burnel